General elections were held in South Africa on 18 October 1961. They were the first general elections after South Africa became a republic following the 1960 South African referendum. The National Party under Hendrik Frensch Verwoerd won a majority in the House of Assembly.

The National Union Party - led by J.D. du P. Basson and ex-Chief Justice Henry Allan Fagan in alliance with the United Party - had been formed as a "bridge" to the United Party for moderate nationalists who were unhappy with Verwoerd's leadership, but the party failed and later merged with the United Party.

This election also saw the first general election appearance of the liberal Progressive Party, which had broken away from the United Party in 1959. The new party retained one MP, in the form of Helen Suzman. She was to remain its sole parliamentary representative until 1974.

Changes in franchise

End of black representation

During the previous Parliament the seats of the three MPs and four Senators representing black South Africans had been abolished. The 1961 election produced the first Parliament with no representation at all for black South Africans.

Coloured Representative Members

The second election for the four Coloured representative members took place on 4 October 1961, before the (white voters only) general election on 18 October 1961. Under the Separate Representation of Voters Act 1951, the members were to serve until the dissolution of the new Parliament.

The four seats were won by Independents, with United Party support. The recently formed Progressive Party did not contest the four vacancies.

Reduction in voting age

This was the first election after the passage of the Electoral Law Amendment Act, No. 30 of 1958, which reduced the voting age for white voters from 21 to 18.

Delimitation of electoral divisions

The South Africa Act 1909 had provided for a delimitation commission to define the boundaries for each electoral division, for general roll voters in the four provinces. The representation by province, under the eleventh delimitation report of 1958, is set out in the table below. The figures in brackets are the number of electoral divisions in the previous (1953) delimitation. If there is no figure in brackets then the number was unchanged.

This was only the second general election, in South African history, where the boundaries were unchanged from the previous election.

Composition at the dissolution

At the end of the 12th Parliament elected since the Union of 1910, when it was dissolved in 1961, the House of Assembly consisted of two groups of members. White voters were represented by 156 general roll members and coloured voters in Cape Province by four white MPs known at the time as Coloured Representative Members (CRM).

The general election only affected the representatives of white voters. The other members were elected on a different date (see above).

The representation by party and province, at the dissolution was:-

Results

By province

References

 In No Uncertain Terms, by Helen Suzman (Mandarin Paperback 1994)
 Keesing's Contemporary Archives
 South Africa 1982 Official Yearbook of the Republic of South Africa, published by Chris van Rensburg Publications

General elections in South Africa
South Africa
General
Events associated with apartheid
October 1961 events in Africa